A monocle is a type of corrective lens used to correct or enhance the visual perception in only one eye. It consists of a circular lens placed in front of the eye and held in place by the eye socket itself. Often, to avoid losing the monocle, a string or wire is connected to the wearer's clothing at one end and, at the other end, to either a hole in the lens or, more often, a wire ring around its circumference.

Origins
The antiquarian Philipp von Stosch wore a monocle in Rome in the 1720s, in order to closely examine engravings and antique engraved gems, but the monocle did not become an article of gentlemen's apparel until the 19th century. The dandy's quizzing glass of the 1790s was an article of high fashion, which differs from the monocle in being held to one's eye with a handle in a fashion similar to a lorgnette, rather than being held in place by the eye socket itself.

Styles 

There are three additional styles of the monocle. The first style consists of a simple loop of metal with a lens that was slotted into the eye orbit. These were the first monocles worn in England and could be found from the 1830s onwards. The second style, which was developed in the 1890s, was the most elaborate, consisting of a frame with a raised edge-like extension known as the gallery. The gallery was designed to help secure the monocle in place by raising it out of the eye's orbit slightly so that the eyelashes would not jar it. Monocles with galleries were often the most expensive. The wealthy would have the frames custom-made to fit their eye sockets. A sub-category of the galleried monocle was the "sprung gallery", where the gallery was replaced by an incomplete circle of flattened, ridged wire supported by three posts. The ends were pulled together, the monocle was placed in the eye orbit, and the ends were released, causing the gallery to spring out and keep the monocle in place.
The third style of monocle was frameless. This consisted of a cut piece of glass, with a serrated edge to provide a grip and sometimes a hole drilled into one side for a cord. Often the frameless monocle had no cord and would be worn freely. This style was popular at the beginning of the 20th century as the lens could be cut to fit any shape eye orbit inexpensively, without the cost of a customized frame.

Wearing a monocle is generally not uncomfortable. If customized, monocles could be worn securely with little effort. However, periodic adjustment is common for monocle wearers to keep the monocle from popping, as can be seen in films featuring Erich von Stroheim. Often only the rich could afford to have a monocle custom-fabricated, while the poor had to settle for ill-fitting monocles that were less comfortable and less secure. The popular perception was (and still is) that a monocle could easily fall off with the wrong facial expression. This is true to an extent, for example raising the eyebrow too far will allow the monocle to fall.

A once-standard comedic device exploits this: an upper-class gentleman affects a shocked expression in response to some event, and his monocle falls into his drink or smashes to pieces on the floor, etc.

Wearers 
During the late 19th and early 20th centuries, the monocle was generally associated with wealthy upper-class men. Combined with a morning coat and a top hat, the monocle completed the costume of the stereotypical 1890s capitalist. Monocles were also accessories of German military officers from this period; especially from World War I and World War II. German military officers known to have worn a monocle include Hans Krebs, Werner von Fritsch, Erich Ludendorff, Walter Model, Walter von Reichenau, Dietrich von Saucken, Wilhelm Keitel, Hans von Seeckt, and Hugo Sperrle.

Monocles were most prevalent in the late 19th century, but are rarely worn today. This is due in large part to advances in optometry which allow for better measurement of refractive error, so that glasses and contact lenses can be prescribed with different strengths in each eye.

The monocle did, however, gain a following in the stylish lesbian circles of the early 20th century, when lesbians would wear a monocle for effect. Such women included Una Lady Troubridge, Radclyffe Hall, and Weimar German reporter Sylvia von Harden; The painting Portrait of the Journalist Sylvia Von Harden by German expressionist painter Otto Dix depicts its subject wearing a monocle.

Famous figures who wore a monocle include British politicians Joseph Chamberlain, his son Austen, Henry Chaplin, and Angus Maude. Percy Toplis (The Monocled Mutineer), founder of Pakistan Mohammad Ali Jinnah, Portuguese President António de Spínola, filmmakers Fritz Lang and Erich von Stroheim, prominent 19th-century Portuguese writer Eça de Queiroz, Soviet writer Mikhail Bulgakov, actor Conrad Veidt, Dadaists Tristan Tzara and Raoul Hausmann, esoteric-fascist Julius Evola, French collaborationist politician Louis Darquier de Pellepoix, Poet laureate Alfred Lord Tennyson, singer Richard Tauber, diplomat Christopher Ewart-Biggs (a smoked-glass monocle, to disguise his glass eye), Major Johnnie Cradock, actors Ralph Lynn, George Arliss and Martyn Green, and Karl Marx. In another vein, G. E. M. Anscombe was one of only a few noted women who occasionally wore a monocle. Famous wearers of the 21st century so far include astronomer Sir Patrick Moore, and former boxer Chris Eubank. Abstract expressionist painter Barnett Newman wore a monocle mainly for getting a closer look at artworks. Richard Tauber wore a monocle to mask a squint in one eye. The Irish poet William Butler Yeats wore them at times too.

In popular culture 
 Ernst Stavro Blofeld in You Only Live Twice
 Planters mascot Mr. Peanut
 Lord Peter Wimsey - Aristocratic 1920s sleuth
 The P. G. Wodehouse character Psmith
 Batman antagonist the Penguin
 Avengers antagonist and leader of HYDRA Baron Wolfgang Von Strucker
 Count von Count from the children's program Sesame Street
 The New Yorker mascot Eustace Tilley, an early 19th-century dandy, is depicted using a monocle like a quizzing glass.
 A monocle is also a distinctive part of the costume of at least three Gilbert & Sullivan characters: Major-General Stanley in The Pirates of Penzance; Sir Joseph Porter in H.M.S. Pinafore; Reginald Bunthorne in Patience; Lord Tolloller in Iolanthe; and Composer Sullivan. In some variant productions, numerous other characters wear the distinctive eyewear, and some noted performers of the "G&S" repertoire also have worn a monocle such as Martyn Green.
 The Doctor, played by William Hartnell
 Mr. Uppity from the Mr Men franchise
 Many of the works of Osamu Tezuka including Black Jack and Astro Boy
 The United Kingdom from Countryballs
 Doctor Yorkshire Bell
 Pompadour from Babar
 Lord Scrappeton from Super Robot Monkey Team Hyperforce Go!
 The French gentleman thief Arsene Lupin is commonly said to have a monocle and is illustrated with it on whenever not under a disguise.
 Charlie McCarthy, the famous dummy of Edgar Bergen, wore a monocle and was normally attired in formal wear.
 Werner Klemperer as Kommandant Wilhelm Klink in Hogan's Heroes
 Doc Savage aide 'Johnny' Littlejohn wore a monocle, as he was blind in one eye.
The Calculus Affair and Tintin and the Picaros, Colonel Sponsz can be seen wearing a monocle.
 Fearless Leader from The Rocky and Bullwinkle Show.
Cigars of the Pharaoh, The Blue Lotus, The Red Sea Sharks and Flight 714 to Sydney, Rastapopoulos wears a monocle.
 Momo Kawashima from the anime series Girls und Panzer wears a monocle akin to one half of a pair of glasses.
 Captain Good, a character in the book King Solomon's Mines, wore a monocle. Remote natives thought it was part of his eye, giving credence to his claim that he was a god.
 In the Mel Brooks' film Young Frankenstein, Inspector Kemp (portrayed by Kenneth Mars) absurdly wears a monocle over the eye patch that covers his left eye.
 Sir Reginald Hargreeves from The Umbrella Academy, played by Colm Feore in the TV series of the same name
 The Grand Duke from “Cinderella”
 Top Hat - The railway boat from “Tugs”
 Henrietta "Heinrich" Von Marzipan - Codename: Kids Next Door
 Arpeggio - Sly Cooper
 Tucker Cobblepot from “Batman Returns”
 Wilkins - Muppet star from Wilkins tea commercials
 Mr. Herriman - Foster's Home for Imaginary Friends
 Archibald Asparagus - VeggieTales 
 In the VeggieTales video, "The Penniless Princess", Larry the Cucumber wore one in the countertop scenes.
 Same thing for Mr. Nezzer in the videos "Minnesota Cuke and the Search for Noah's Umbrella", "Saint Nicholas: A Story of Joyful Giving", "It's a Meaningful Life", and "'Twas the Night Before Easter". 
 Absolem - Alice in Wonderland
 Retro-Blade - Retro-Puppetmaster, He wears a monocle on his concept art and action figure, but he never wears one in the movie.
 Anti-Cosmo - The Fairly OddParents
 The Chess King that appeared in an episode of Rupert, "Rupert and Bill in Gameland".
 A few other characters that appeared in Rupert such as Sir Jasper from "Rupert and Little Yum", a random fish from "Rupert's Undersea Adventure", Sir Humphrey Pumphrey from "Rupert and The Nile" and "Rupert and the Mystery Isle", and a peacock character from "Rupert and Queen Bess" have also worn monocles.
 Calico - Muppet Treasure Island
 Doctor von Reichter - Cybersix
 Countess Natasha von Numeral - Sesame Street
 Liam Neeson - Sesame Street
 Balthazar - The Christmas Toy and The Secret Life of Toys
 Squealer - Animal Farm
 Sergei Rachmaninoff - Sesame Street
 Coleridge the Albatross - Muppets at Sea
 Baron Von Rottweiler - Dog City
 Ludwig Von Richtor - Jumanji
 Skull with a bone and a knife crossing together - PB & Death
 The Squire from The Berenstain Bears who appeared in the episode "The Hiccup Cure".
 Albert - Johnny Test (in one episode).
 The episode "It's Du-KAY Johnny" had Dukey wearing one in the title card.
 Hanneman von Essar - Fire Emblem: Three Houses
 The March Hare - The Australian version of Alice in Wonderland
 The White Rabbit - The Jetlag Productions version of Alice in Wonderland
 Von Vulture - The Commando
 Nazi Saboteur Leader - Secret Agent
 Chairmouse - The Rescuers
 Grand Duke of Owls - Rock-a-Doodle
 Otis O. Otis - King Features Syndicate
 Director Charles - Garfield Gets Real, Fun Fest and Pet Force
 Black and White Faction - Spy vs. Spy
 Baron Barracuda - Diver Dan
 Monte Sparrow - Looney Tunes, Strife With Father
 Little John - Robin Hood, Disguised as Sir Reginald, Duke of Chutney
  is an emoji

See also 
 Glasses, traditional lens
 Pince-nez, glasses that grip the bridge of the nose
 Lorgnette, glasses that are held with a side-handle
 Monocular, a small hand held magnifying telescope
 Contact lens

References 

1830s fashion
1890s fashion
19th-century fashion
20th-century fashion
Eyewear